This is a list of Albanian writers.

A
 Rreze Abdullahu (born 1990)
 Dritëro Agolli (1931–2017)
 Mimoza Ahmeti (born 1963)
 Ylljet Aliçka (born 1951)
 Gëzim Alpion (born 1962)
 Valdete Antoni (born 1953)
 Fatos Arapi (1930–2018)
 Lindita Arapi (born 1972)
 Pjetër Arbnori (1935–2006)
 Asdreni (1872–1947)

B
 Frang Bardhi (1606–1643)
 Marin Barleti (15th century)
 Eqrem Basha (born 1948)
 Mario Bellizzi (born 1957)
 Nafiz Bezhani (1928–2004)
 Ben Blushi (born 1969)
 Pjetër Bogdani (1630–1689)
 Flora Brovina (born 1949)
 Maria Antonia Braile (20th century)
 Dionis Bubani (1926–2006)
 Gjergj Bubani (1899–1954)
 Klara Buda (21st century)
 Pjetër Budi (1566–1622)
 Uran Butka (born 1938)
 Gjon Buzuku (16th century)

C
 Martin Camaj (1925–1992)
 Nicola Chetta (1741–1803)
 Selfixhe Ciu (1918–2003)
 Constantine of Berat (18th century)

Ç
 Nelson Çabej (born 1939)
 Aleks Çaçi (1916–1989)
 Andon Zako Çajupi (1866–1930)
 Thoma Çami (19th century)
 Spiro Çomora (1918–1973)
 Diana Çuli (born 1951)

D
 Gavril Dara the Younger (1826–1885)
 Adem Demaçi (1936–2018)
 Musa Demi (1878–1971)
 Jeronim De Rada (1814–1903)
 Ridvan Dibra (born 1959)
 Dora d'Istria (1828–1888)
 Spiro Dine (1846–1922)
 Elvira Dones (born 1960)
 Yahya Dukagjini (1498–1582)

E
 Pal Engjëlli (1416–1470)
 Rudi Erëbara (born 1971)

F
 Nikollë Filja (1691–1769)
 Gjergj Fishta (1871–1940) 
 Nezim Frakulla (1680–1760)
 Dalip Frashëri (19th century)
 Naim Frashëri (1846–1900)
 Sami Frashëri (1850–1904)
 Shahin Frashëri (19th century)
 Llazar Fundo (1899–1944)

G

 Mirko Gashi (1939–1995)
 Sabri Godo (1929–2011)
 Gregory of Durrës (18th century)
 Odhise Grillo (1932–2003)
 Luigj Gurakuqi (1879–1925)

Gj
 Fatmir Gjata (1922–1989)
 Kadri Gjata (1865–1912)
 Julia Gjika (born 1949)

H
 Sinan Hasani (1922–2010)
 Ervin Hatibi (born 1974)
 Rifat Hoxha (born 1946)
 Shefki Hysa (born 1957)

I
 Anilda Ibrahimi (born 1972)
 Vera Isaku (born 1955)
 Nikolla Ivanaj (1879–1951)

J 
 Halil Jaçellari (1940–2009) 
 Petro Janura (1911–1983)
 Irhan Jubica (born 1973)

K

 Helena Kadare (born 1943)
 Ismail Kadare (born 1936)
 Hasan Zyko Kamberi (18th century)
 Veli Karahoda (born 1968)
 Amik Kasoruho (1932–2014)
 Teodor Keko (1958–2002)
 Jeton Kelmendi (born 1978)
 Skifter Këlliçi (born 1938)
 Ardian Klosi (1957–2012)
 Jolanda Kodra (1910–1963)
 Musine Kokalari (1917–1983)
 Vedat Kokona (1913–1998)
 Dashnor Kokonozi (born 1951)
 Aristidh Kola (1944–2000)
 Ernest Koliqi (1903–1975)
 Anastas Kondo (1937–2006)
 Fatos Kongoli (born 1944)
 Faik Konica (1875–1942)
 Vath Koreshi (1936–2006)
 Eulogios Kourilas Lauriotis (1880–1961)
 Irma Kurti (born 1966)
 Mitrush Kuteli (1907–1967)

L
 Teodor Laço (1936–2016)
 Natasha Lako (born 1948)
 Skënder Luarasi (1900–1982)
 Fatos Lubonja (born 1951)

Ll

Luljeta Lleshanaku (born 1968)

M

 Sejfulla Malëshova (1900–1971)
 Gjekë Marinaj (born 1965)
 Petro Marko (1913–1991)
 Petrus Massarechius (16th century)
 Lekë Matrënga (1567–1619)
 Din Mehmeti (1932–2010)
 Vangjel Meksi (1770–1821)
 Esad Mekuli (1916–1993)
 Branko Merxhani (1894–1981)
 Mesihi (15th century)
 Migjeni (1911–1938)
 Ndre Mjeda (1866–1937)
 Betim Muço (1947–2015)
 Besnik Mustafaj (born 1958)
 Gjon Muzaka (16th century)
 Faruk Myrtaj (born 1955)

N
 Sulejman Naibi (18th century)
 Kristo Negovani (1875–1905)
 Ndoc Nikaj (1864–1951)
 Fan Noli (1882–1965)
 Majlinda Nana Rama (born 1980)

P
 Fadil Paçrami (1922–2008)
 Ludmilla Pajo (1947–1995)
 Vaso Pasha (1825–1892)
 Arshi Pipa (1920–1997)
 Aurel Plasari (born 1956)
 Ali Podrimja (1942–2012)
 Lasgush Poradeci (1898–1987)
 Foqion Postoli (1889–1927)
 Iljaz Prokshi (1949–2007)

Q
 Leon Qafzezi (born 1953)
 Gjergj Qiriazi (1868–1912)
 Rexhep Qosja (born 1936)

R
 Kadrush Radogoshi (born 1948)
 Luan Rama (born 1952)
 Musa Ramadani (born 1944)
 Nijazi Ramadani (born 1964)

S
 Francesco Antonio Santori (1819–1894)
 Zef Serembe (1844–1901)
 Nokë Sinishtaj (born 1944)
 Brikena Smajli (born 1970)
 Xhevahir Spahiu (born 1945)
 Sterjo Spasse (1914–1989)
 Luan Starova (born 1941)
 Haki Stërmilli (1895–1953)
 Iliriana Sulkuqi (born 1951)

Sh
 	

 Halit Shamata (born 1953)
 Sokol Shameti (born 1978)
 Bashkim Shehu (born 1955)
 Filip Shiroka (1859–1935)
 Stefan Shundi (1906–1947)
 Dhimitër Shuteriqi (1915–2003)

T
 Skënder Temali (born 1946)
 Ismet Toto (1908–1937)
 Kasëm Trebeshina (1926–2017)

U
 Vorea Ujko (1918–1989)
 Hajro Ulqinaku (born 1938)

V
 Giulio Variboba (1725–1788)
 Ardian Vehbiu (born 1959)
 Naum Veqilharxhi (1797–1846)
 Eqrem Vlora (1885–1964)
 Ornela Vorpsi (born 1968)

W
 Anila Wilms (born 1971)

X
 Jakov Xoxa (1923–1979)

Xh
 Bilal Xhaferri (1935–1986)
 Dhimitër Xhuvani (1934–2009)

Z
 Muçi Zade (18th century)
 Injac Zamputi (1910–1998)
 Tajar Zavalani (1903–1966)
 Petraq Zoto (1937–2015)

Zh
 Gjergj Zheji (1926–2010)
 Petro Zheji (1929–2015)

See also
 List of Albanian-language poets

References

External links
 Albanian Literature

Albanian
Writers